Ahmad Jafari (Persian: احمد جعفری ‌born 3 March 1938, in Arak, Iran) is an architect based in USA whose career began in the 1960s. He was with Disney Imagineering as an Architect and Art Director from 1966 to 2004 and has worked alongside Walt Disney and many Disney Legends. In 2006, he received the NFFC Disney Legend awards.

Early life 

Ahmad Jafari was born on 3 March 1938 in a small city in Arak, in Iran. In 1962, he graduated from Tehran University with Masters in Architecture. In 1963 he moved to United States and studied Architecture at the University of Utah and worked in an architecture firm as an intern architect in both Utah and California. After a few months, he left the university and joined Disneyland engineering department as an architect in 1966. He served The Walt Disney Company as an Architect and Art Director from 1966 to 2004.

Val H. Usle, executive director of architecture at The Walt Disney Company awarded Ahmad for "Recognizing 35 magical years with the Walt Disney company" quoting:"All of us still see your 'design' fingerprints scattered in the parks throughout the world... your creativity has helped define the Disney built environment. It is indeed a very small club of people can claim to have had such involvement and influence."

Awards 
 Disney Legend Award
 Thanks for Imagineering the Dream. Walt Disney Imagineering Retirement Award only 4 ever awarded at the time.
 WED (Walt Disney Imagineering) and Walt Disney's MAPO(Manufacturing and Production Organization) (Walt Disney World Monorail System) engineering. 15 years of service.
 Worldwide Who's Who Professional of the Year, 2013
25 years of distinguished service.
 30 years of distinguished service.
 Recognizing 35 magical years with the Walt Disney Company.
 Aga Khan Award for Architecture (AKAA), 1994, Nominated for Adventureland design, in Disneyland Paris

Career 
 Mehrabad International Airport and Azadi Sport Complex. (1969-1968) Head Architect at Farmanfarma Architectural firm.
 Designing, and producing the 10-year Master Plan for Disneyland. (1969)
 Promoted as lead designer for Disneyland project, working with studio and Disney directors and WED(Walt Disney Imagineering) architect designing the projects for Disneyland. (1971)
 Big Thunder Mountain Railroad. Lead Architect alongside art director at that time, Mr. Tony Baxter. California, USA. (1972-1976)
 Epcot. Florida, United States (1 October 1982).
 Canada Pavilion at Epcot, opening on (1977- 1 October 1982), He was the project design architect.
 Morocco Pavilion at Epcot, opening on (1980- 7 September 1984), He was the project design architect.
 Afriqa Pavilion at Epcot, He was the project design architect.
 Tokyo Disneyland. Lead designer and site theme inspector. Urayasu, Japan. (1982- 15 April 1983)
 Disneyland Park (Paris) (Euro Disneyland). Chief architect for Western Land and Adventureland. Marne-la-Vallée, France. (1986 started the design, 1988 moved to France, opening on 12 April 1992)
 Fantasyland Pre-opening site inspection. (1992)
 Activated CDM Group in Los Angeles, USA. (2000)
 Tokyo Disney Resort, Tokyo DisneySea Hotel MiraCosta. Chief architect and art director. (2001)
 Animal Kingdom Resort Area. Disney's Animal Kingdom Lodge, (Chief design director working alongside executive director, Joe Rohde, art directors and architects). Florida, USA. (2001)
 Hong Kong Disneyland. Concept chief design director and design developer. Lantau Island, Hong Kong. (2001-2004)
 Saraya project, working with Hettema Group as a design director. Aqaba, Jordan. (2004- 2007)
 Theming Intercontinental Hotel, Aqaba
 Legend project in Dubai.
 Sea World project in Dubai.
 Major project in Kangwon Land Korea
 Consultant for WDI designing Ratatouille: The Adventure project for Disneyland Paris. (2009)
 Main Street, Shanghai Disneyland Park, consultant for WDI designing main entrance and Main Street for Shanghai Disneyland Park and design development with Gensler firm in Los Angeles. Shanghai, China. (2011)(Open date in 16 June 2016) 
 Theming Ocean Water Park Project, Iran's first outdoor themed water park. Kish Island, Iran. (2013-2016) Hezaro Yek Shahr Project, Tehran's first theme park. (2013-2016)

External links

References

1938 births
Living people
People from Arak, Iran
Iranian architects
University of Tehran alumni
University of Utah alumni